Michael Wulf (6 December 1963 – 21 July 1993) (also known by the stage name Destructor) was a German heavy metal musician who was a member of Kreator and Sodom. He was a member of Kreator in 1985, joining Sodom later that year. Wulf played guitar on Sodom's 1986 debut album Obsessed by Cruelty and left the band shortly after. Wulf was killed in a motorcycle accident on 21 July 1993 at the age of 29.

References

1963 births
1993 deaths
German heavy metal guitarists
Motorcycle road incident deaths
Kreator members
Sodom (band) members
Road incident deaths in Germany